Celedonio Dómeco de Jarauta (3 March 1814 – 19 July 1848) was a Spanish soldier, Catholic priest and later a Mexican guerrilla leader in the Mexican-American War.

Celedonio Dómeco de Jarauta was born in Zaragoza, Spain, on March 3, 1814.  He fought as a Carlist in the First Carlist War.  He emigrated to Havana, Cuba, and took Holy Orders becoming a priest.  In 1844 was granted a parish in Veracruz, and immigrated to Mexico.  In 1847, when the Americans landed near Veracruz was appointed chaplain of the 2nd Infantry Regiment, then head of the field hospital.  After the fall of the city he went into the countryside and organized companies of guerrillas then commanded a force of them, harassing American convoys, small parties and couriers between Veracruz and Puebla especially in the Sotovento region, the coastal plain of the state of Veracruz.

On September 14, 1847, when the authorities of Mexico City had evacuated the population and the forces of American General Winfield Scott, after the capture of Chapultepec, were preparing to take the city, Jarauta helped by other European priests and Mexican military, in disagreement with their government, they put up tough resistance to the Americans, delaying the occupation for at least 72 hours and thereby forcing the possibility of an agreement.

After the fall of Mexico City, on January 19, 1848, Jarauta published a broadside, in Puebla, Viva la Republica Mexicana : Mexicanos, a patriotic call for continuing resistance to the U.S. forces in Mexico.  After the peace treaty of Treaty of Guadalupe Hildalgo was concluded February 2, 1848, Jarauta refused to acknowledge it and disband his troops.  On February 25, 1848, an American force under Gen. Joseph Lane made a forced march which surprised and defeated the force of Padre Jarauta at Zacualtipan in the action of Sequalteplan, but he was able to flee and continue his fight.

Opposed to the treaty and the policies of President Manuel de la Peña y Peña, he joined General Mariano Paredes, Manuel Doblado and others in armed revolt, but they were defeated by the remaining Mexican Army under General Anastasio Bustamante at Guanajuato on July 18, 1848.  Jarauta was captured while on a reconnaissance of the neighborhoods of Mellado and La Valenciana and shot for revolutionary activities on Bustamante's order the next day by Mexican troops in the La Valenciana Mine on July 19, 1848.

References

1814 births
1848 deaths